Grimstone may refer to:

Places
 Grimstone, Dorset, England
 Grimstone, North Yorkshire, England

Other
 Grimstone (surname)

See also 
 Grimston (disambiguation)